The Odisha State Financial Corporation, formerly known as Orissa State Financial Corporation is a state financial corporation of Odisha. The corporation was established in 1956 under the State Financial Corporations Act, 1951 and State Financial Corporations (Amendment) Act 2000 with the main object of providing loan assistance to the micro, small and medium enterprises.

Branch offices

External links
Official Website of Odisha State Financial Corporation

Economy of Odisha
State financial corporations of India
State agencies of Odisha
1956 establishments in Orissa
Indian companies established in 1956